The 2000 congressional elections in Maryland were held on November 7, 2000, to determine the persons representing the state of Maryland in the United States House of Representatives. Maryland held eight seats in the House, apportioned according to the 1990 United States Census. Representatives were elected for two-year terms; those elected in 2000 served in the 107th Congress from January 3, 2001 until January 3, 2003.

As of 2021, this is the last time Maryland’s delegation to the United States House of Representatives was tied.

Overview

|- style="background-color: #e9e9e9; font-weight: bold;"
! scope="row" colspan="2" style="text-align: right;" | Totals
| style="text-align: right;" | 8
| style="text-align: right;" | 0
| style="text-align: right;" | 0
| style="text-align: right;" | —
| style="text-align: right;" | 100%
| style="text-align: right;" | 100%
| style="text-align: right;" | 1,926,764
| style="text-align: right;" |
|}

District 1

District 2

District 3

District 4

District 5

District 6

District 7

District 8

References

External links
 Maryland State Board of Elections

2000
Maryland
United States House of Representatives